Jesse Chism (born March 4, 1980) is an American politician. He is a Democrat representing District 85 in the Tennessee House of Representatives.

Political career 

In 2018, former District 85 representative Johnnie Turner announced that she would not seek another term. Chism ran for her seat, won a four-way Democratic primary with 35.7% of the vote, and was unopposed in the general election. He is running for re-election in 2020.

As of June 2020, Chism serves on the following committees:
 Agriculture and Natural Resources Committee
 Agriculture and Natural Resources Subcommittee
 Commerce Committee
 Business Subcommittee
 Local Committee
 Elections & Campaign Finance Subcommittee

Electoral record

References 

Democratic Party members of the Tennessee House of Representatives
African-American state legislators in Tennessee
Living people
1980 births
Politicians from Memphis, Tennessee
Morehouse College alumni
Union University alumni
21st-century American politicians
21st-century African-American politicians
20th-century African-American people